Siegfried Peak is a peak that forms a saddle with Siegmund Peak immediately southward, standing at the east side of the entrance to Odin Valley in the Asgard Range of Victoria Land, in Antarctica. Named after Siegfried, the peak is one in a group of features in the area named after characters Norse mythology by New Zealand Antarctic Place-Names Committee (NZ-APC). Siegfried was the hero of various German legends, particularly of the Nibelungenlied.

References

Mountains of the Asgard Range
McMurdo Dry Valleys